The Metropolitan Hotel  is the sixth studio album by American country music artist Chely Wright. It was her first album for the Dualtone label, after a failed deal with the Vivaton! label. This album produced four singles, of which two were Top 40 hits on the country music charts: the number 40 "Back of the Bottom Drawer" and "The Bumper of My SUV" at number 35. The third and fourth singles ("The River" and a cover of Chuck Berry's "You Never Can Tell", respectively), both failed to chart. Wright left Dualtone after the release of this album.

Track listing

Personnel
As listed in liner notes:

 Steve Brewster – drums
 Tom Bukovac – electric guitar
 Jimmy Carter – bass guitar
 Eric Darken – percussion
 Chip Davis – background vocals
 Stuart Duncan – mandolin
 Shannon Forrest – drums
 Vince Gill – background vocals
 Tony Harrell – keyboards
 Aubrey Haynie – fiddle
 Mark Hill – bass guitar
 Sean Hurley – bass guitar
 Travis Javis – piano
 Jeff King – electric guitar
 Chris McHugh – drums
 Greg Morrow – drums
 Gordon Mote – piano, keyboards
 James T. Olsen – electric guitar
 Russ Pahl – steel guitar
 Billy Panda – acoustic guitar
 Scotty Sanders – steel guitar
 Bryan Sutton – acoustic guitar
 Michael Hart Thompson – electric guitar
 Emily West – background vocals
 John Willis – acoustic guitar
 Chely Wright – lead vocals
 Jonathan Yudkin – mandolin

Strings on "Back of the Bottom Drawer" and "The River" performed by the Nashville String Machine, conducted and arranged by Steve W. Maldin. Strings on "Between a Mother and a Child" performed and arranged by Jonathan Yudkin.

Chart performance

References

2005 albums
Dualtone Records albums
Chely Wright albums